Hans Büchi (born 16 May 1929) is a Swiss boxer. He competed at the 1952 Summer Olympics and the 1960 Summer Olympics.

References

External links
 

1929 births
Living people
Swiss male boxers
Olympic boxers of Switzerland
Boxers at the 1952 Summer Olympics
Boxers at the 1960 Summer Olympics
Light-middleweight boxers
Sportspeople from Thurgau